Mister Teen Indonesia 2015, the first edition of the Mister Teen Indonesia pageant, held on May 10, 2015 in Pasuruan, East Java. 13 contestants competed for the title. Dolly Parlin of North Sumatera crowned as the first ever Mister Teen Indonesia. Nevertheless, Dolly Parlin resigned from his title after he won Mister Teen International 2015 pageant, while Ryandi Anugerah could not fulfill the protocoler of IMP Organization as he is sent to an International Teen Pageant under the license of his agency. Regarding these conditions, Tandi Islami as 2nd Runner Up Mister Teen Indonesia 2015 has a right to take over the title as Mister Teen Indonesia 2015.

Result

Placements

Special Award

Contestants

Board of the Judges

Crossovers
Starteen Indonesia
East Java: Aldian Muhammad (Semifinalist)
Wajah Natasha
Riau: Ryandi Anugerah (Top 5 Male Category)
Aceh: Rinaldy Krishnawan (Unplaced / Teen Category)
Mister Global Teen
Riau: Ryandi Anugerah (TBA)

References

2015 in Indonesia
May 2015 events in Indonesia